Estadio 12 de Febrero (also known as the Estadio Ramón Hernández) is a multi-use stadium in El Vigía, Venezuela.  It is currently used mostly for football matches and is the home stadium of Atlético El Vigía Fútbol Club.   The stadium holds 12,785 people.

References

12 de Febrero
Buildings and structures in Mérida (state)
Buildings and structures in El Vigia